Kevin Heffernan (20 August 1929 – 25 January 2013) was an Irish Gaelic footballer and manager who played as a left corner-forward at senior level for the Dublin county team.

Heffernan made his debut during the 1948 championship and was a regular member of the starting fifteen until his retirement after the 1962 championship. During that time he won one All-Ireland medal, four Leinster medals and three National League medals. An All-Ireland runner-up on one occasion, Heffernan captained the team to the All-Ireland title in 1958.

At club level Heffernan enjoyed a lengthy career with St. Vincent's. He won fifteen county football championship medals and six county hurling championship medals.

In retirement from playing Heffernan became involved in coaching and team management. As Dublin manager he revived the county team and steered them to three All-Ireland titles between 1974 and 1983.

Heffernan has a number of personal achievements. In 1974 he became the only non-player to be honoured as the Texaco Footballer of the Year. In 1984 he was named in the left corner-forward position on the GAA's Team of the Century. He was confirmed in this position when the Team of the Millennium was named in 1999.

Early and private life
Kevin Heffernan was born on 20 August 1929 in Dublin. Unlike many of his contemporaries, he was not born into a football background, as his father's interests included hunting and shooting rather than Gaelic games. Heffernan's family moved to the Marino area of the city when he was very young, and it was here that he first came into contact with both football and hurling. He later attended Scoil Mhuire and St. Joseph's Christian Brothers school, Fairview, where he made great progress as a hurler and as a footballer. It was in secondary school that he first tasted major success, as he won a Leinster Colleges hurling title in 1945.

By profession Heffernan was a personnel manager for the Electricity Supply Board (ESB) and he became Chairman of the Labour Court.

Playing career

Club
Heffernan's club hurling and football career coincided with a hugely successful period in the history of the famous St Vincent's club in Dublin. In terms of football he won a total of 15 senior county championship medals, completing a seven in-a-row 1949 to 1955, a six in-a-row between 1957 and 1962, before winning his 14th and 15th county titles in 1966 and 1967. Heffernan also won six senior county championship hurling titles in 1953, 1954, 1955, 1957, 1959 and 1962.

Inter-county
Heffernan played both hurling and football at minor level with Dublin in the early 1940s. He had some success at these levels, winning a Leinster minor football medal in 1946 and a Leinster minor hurling medal in 1947. He made his senior debut for the Dublin footballers the same year that he was sitting his Leaving Certificate, breaking his jaw in a game just days before his first exam. In spite of this inauspicious start Heffernan went on to have a distinguished inter-county career.

Heffernan first tasted success in 1948 when he won an All-Ireland medal with the junior football team. In 1953 he won a National Football League before winning a second medal in 1955. Later that same year Heffernan claimed his first Leinster; however, his side were later defeated by Kerry in the All-Ireland final. Three years later in 1958 Heffernan was captain of Dublin when he won his third National League title as well as a second Leinster title. He later guided his native-county to an All-Ireland victory over Derry. Heffernan later won two further Leinster titles in 1959 and 1962, however, there was no further All-Ireland titles. He retired from inter-county football shortly afterwards.

Managerial career

Following a great inter-county career with Dublin, he became manager of the senior inter-county team in late 1973, with Donal Colfer and Lorcan Redmond as his fellow selectors. The era was dominated by the intense rivalry between Dublin and Kerry. In his first championship season in charge he guided 'the Dubs' to their first Leinster and All-Ireland titles since 1963. Heffernan's young Dublin side captivated the imagination of the youth and working class of the city, traditionally not Gaelic Football followers. The Dublin fans branded themselves 'Heffo's Army' in his honour, and this was the start of the Dublin Hill 16 terrace culture which remains strong in the present day.

Following the completion of the championship Heffernan became the only non-player to be nominated Texaco Footballer of the Year. In 1975 Dublin captured a second consecutive Leinster title; however, a young Kerry team caught Heffernan's teams in a complacent mood in the subsequent All-Ireland final. Dublin bounced back the following year to win the National League as well as a third Leinster title in-a-row before going on to defeat Kerry in the All-Ireland final.

Following this victory Heffernan unexpectedly resigned as manager of Dublin, being replaced by Tony Hanahoe who acted as player-captain-manager. Heffernan returned as manager in 1979 but, after claiming a sixth consecutive Leinster title, lost out to Kerry in the All-Ireland final. Much of the Dublin team fell by the wayside after 1980 but Heffernan built a new team centred on midfield stalwart Brian Mullins and, in another memorable match remembered mainly for its unsporting conduct, a twelve-man Dublin team to victory over a fourteen-man Galway in the All-Ireland Final of 1983. Played in atrocious conditions the referee sent off four players, three of which were from Dublin, and their win saw the team being dubbed 'the twelve apostles'. In January 1986 Heffernan stepped down as Dublin manager.

Retirement and death
Following his retirement from inter-county management Heffernan continued to have a keen involvement in Gaelic football. In 1984, the GAA's centenary year, he was named in the left corner-forward position on the GAA's Football Team of the Century before later managing Ireland to victory over Australia in the International Rules Series in 1986.

In 2000, Heffernan's status as one of the greatest players of all-time was further cemented when he was named in the left corner-forward position on the GAA's 'Football Team of the Millennium.' He also continued his involvement with the St Vincent's club. In 2004, at the age of 74, Heffernan was in charge of the club's under 15 hurling team, which, with a late free from Oliver McElvaney, won a memorable championship final against Cuala, having defeated Ballyboden in the semi-final. This particular St Vincent's team had never beaten either of those clubs before, showing that Heffernan's management touch had not deserted him. In 2006, he trained the club's minor hurling team.

In 2005, Heffernan was granted the Freedom of the City of Dublin, placing him in a pantheon that includes U2, Nelson Mandela and Bill Clinton. He was also among the 25 recipients of the Irish Examiner GAA President's Awards for 2006. The ceremony which was presented by the former GAA president Seán Kelly, took place on 31 March 2006.

Heffernan was a consultant to the management of the Dublin minor football team for 2007. His appointment received overwhelming approval from the Dublin County Board and he was working with the Dublin minor boss Timmy McCarthy and his managerial colleagues John Archibald and John Lowndes in an advisory capacity for the young Dubs.

Heffernan died in January 2013. At his funeral, attended by huge crowds among them senior politicians, three flags—the Dublin and St Vincent's GAA club flags plus a flag Heffernan got in 2005 when he was awarded the Freedom of Dublin—were put up at the side of the altar; he was buried in Sutton cemetery.

Honours
 Freedom of the City of Dublin: 2004

See also
 List of people on stamps of Ireland

References

 

1929 births
2013 deaths
All-Ireland-winning captains (football)
Dual players
Dublin inter-county Gaelic footballers
Dublin hurlers
ESB people
Gaelic football forwards
Gaelic football managers
St Vincents (Dublin) Gaelic footballers
St Vincents (Dublin) hurlers
Texaco Footballers of the Year